WBCF may refer to:

 WBCF (AM), a radio station (1240 AM) licensed to serve Florence, Alabama, United States
 WBCF-LD, a defunct low-power television station (channel 39) formerly licensed to serve Florence, Alabama
 WBCF-LP, a defunct low-power television station (channel 3) formerly licensed to serve Florence, Alabama